"You're My Everything" is a 2004 song by American recording artist Anita Baker. The song was released as the lead single in support of her hit album, My Everything.

Chart performance
Anita Baker's single, "You're My Everything" peaked at number 25 on Billboard's Hot R&B/Hip-Hop Songs, Baker's first top 40 since 1995's "It's Been You" from her Rhythm of Love album.

Track listing
Europe CD Single", Single CD

Charts

Weekly charts

Year-end charts

References

External links
 www.AnitaBaker.com

2004 singles
Anita Baker songs
Songs written by Anita Baker
2004 songs
Blue Note Records singles